Manfred Nathan (1875–1945) was a South African lawyer, judge, and writer. He served as President of the Special Appeals Court for Income Tax matters. Nathan was a member of the first executive of the South African Jewish Board of Deputies in 1912 and vice-president of the South African Zionist Federation from 1904 to 1907. He held political offices in the Transvaal. His historical writing and his biography of Paul Kruger were for many years standard references.

Selected publications
The Common Law of South Africa (1904–09)
The South African Commonwealth (1919)
Empire Government : An Outline of the System Prevailing in the British Commonwealth of Nations (London:  Allen & Unwin, 1928).
Not Heaven Itself (1944)
The Voortrekkers of South Africa (1937)
Paul Kruger (1941)

References 

 

1875 births
1945 deaths
20th-century South African judges
South African Jews
Jewish non-fiction writers
Legal writers
South African autobiographers
Transvaal Colony people
South African Zionists